Lake Sagaris (born 1956 in Montreal, Quebec) is a Canadian journalist, poet, writer, urban planner, translator, and community leader who lives in Chile.

When she was elected a leader into the Bellavista neighborhood association in the 1990s she became active in neighborhood issues. Sagaris achieved a Master of Science in 2006 and got her PhD in Urban Planning and Community Development in 2012 both at the University of Toronto.

Her book After the First Death: A Journey Through Chile, Time, Mind was a non-fiction finalist for the 1996 Governor General's Awards for Literary Merit.
She won first prize in the Periodical Writers Association of Canada Magazine and Newspaper Travel Writing Contest 1997 for her article "Norte Grande."

Books 
Sagaris, Lake. Bone and dream : into the world's driest desert.  1st ed. -- Toronto : A.A. Knopf Canada, c2000.  (about the Atacama desert in Chile)
Sagaris, Lake. After the first death : a journey through Chile, time, mind. Toronto : Somerville House Publishing, c1996. xxviii, 401 p., [8] p. of plates : ill., maps, ports. ; 24 cm. 
Sagaris, Lake. Medusa's children : a journey from Newfoundland to Chiloé. Regina : Coteau Books, c1993. 142 p. : map ; 23 cm. 
Sagaris, Lake. Exile home = Exilio en la patria.  [Dunvegan, Ont.] : Cormorant Books, Casa Canadá, c1986. 104 p. ; 23 cm. Poems in English and Spanish.

External links
Lake Sagaris Official site.
Sagaris, Lake. "Fear eats the soul." new internationalist, issue 161 - July 1986
Sagaris, Lake - "Not Now, NAFTA - Chile and the North American Free Trade Agreement" - Sierra,  January 1999
Living on Earth,  December 4, 1998. Chip Plant Threatens Chilean Rainforest, by Lake Sagaris

References

Kolbeins, Melanie. Review of Bone and Dream by Lake Sagaris. Canadian Literature, issue 181 (Summer 2004): 103–104.
The Writers' Union of Canada - Lake Sagaris

Living people
1956 births
20th-century Canadian poets
Canadian emigrants to Chile
Canadian women journalists
Canadian women poets
Journalists from Montreal
Writers from Montreal
20th-century Canadian women writers
Canadian women non-fiction writers